Dakota Hotels is a UK-based hotel brand with five locations, each with a brasserie-style Grill and cocktail Bars. Dakota Hotels first opened two boutique hotels near Edinburgh Airport in South Queensferry, and in Eurocentral, Motherwell South East of Glasgow. The brand has now expanded into Central Glasgow, Leeds, and Manchester. The brand was founded by Ken McCulloch and is owned by Evans Property Group.

History 
The brand was named after the Douglas DC-3 aircraft introduced in 1936 for commercial air travel in the United States, which was designated the Dakota in Royal Air Force service.

The press have reported celebrities as staying at Dakota Hotels including Hugh Jackman, Arnold Schwarzenegger, Katy Perry, Liam Gallagher, Stereophonics, The Stone Roses, Glenn Close, Melanie Brown, Noel Gallagher, Christian Slater, Gary Lineker, and Andy Murray.

Brand Expansion 
Dakota Eurocentral was opened in 2006 as a new build in Motherwell, off the M8 motorway in Lanarkshire, followed subsequently by another new build in South Queensferry close to Edinburgh Airport by the Queensferry Crossing in 2007.

A third hotel and the first city centre location was opened on West Regent Street in Glasgow in 2016 followed by a fourth on Greek street in Leeds in early 2017.

The largest hotel is in Manchester city centre, near to Manchester Piccadilly railway station, with 137 bedrooms opened in May 2019.

Founder 

Dakota was created by Glasgow born hotelier Ken McCulloch. Other hotels previously launched by McCulloch include One Devonshire Gardens in Glasgow, the Malmaison brand, the Columbus Hotel Monaco, and the Aviator Hotel at Farnborough Airport.

Hotel interiors were designed by Amanda Rosa Interiors (Ken McCulloch's wife), who also designed the Malmaison brand and Columbus Hotel Monaco.

Educational partnerships 

Dakota Hotels has established links with Queen Margaret University and Fife College to provide internships to hospitality students. Dakota Hotels is part of the Mentor Scheme formed between the Manchester Hotelier’s Association (MHA) and Manchester Metropolitan University (MMU).

The hotel has previously established awards for university students at Queen Margaret University, focusing on dissertations in hospitality.

Dakota Hotels is a 2021 sponsor of HIT Scotland, a scholarship programme designed to support people working and studying in the hospitality industry in Scotland.

Awards 

TripAdvisor Travellers' Choice Awards 2021 – Top 25 Hotels in the UK
The Caterer – Top 30 Best Places to Work in Hospitality 2021
The Michelin Guide – Michelin Plate 2021
The Caterer – Top 10 Best Places to Work in Hospitality 2020
GQ Magazine 2018 Best Hotel – Shortlist of 5
TripAdvisor Travellers' Choice Awards 2018 – Top 25 Hotels in the UK 
The Independent 2018 Best in Contemporary Design
The Times Cool Hotel Guide 2013
Jamie Oliver Best Kept Secret Award 2013
Condé Nast Traveller Hot list 2005
Ken McCulloch was the 2018 winner of the "Very Special Achievement award"  at the Scottish Style Awards  and was the 1993 winner of The Caterer's Hotelier of the Year.

External links

References 

Hotels in Scotland
Hotels in England
2004 establishments in the United Kingdom